Heart and Soul: New Songs from Ally McBeal is a soundtrack album by American singer Vonda Shepard, featuring music from the American television series Ally McBeal. It was released on November 9, 1999, by Epic Records, 550 Music, and Sony Music Soundtrax.

Track listing
All tracks are produced by Vonda Shepard, except tracks 1, 2 and 10–12, produced by Shepard and Mitchell Froom.

Charts

Weekly charts

Year-end charts

Certifications

References

1999 soundtrack albums
550 Music albums
Albums produced by Mitchell Froom
Ally McBeal
Epic Records soundtracks
Television soundtracks
Vonda Shepard soundtracks